The British International Championships was a darts team competition run under the auspices of the British Darts Organisation. It is contested for by the nations of England, Scotland and Wales.

History 
First held in 1979, with separate events for both men and women, the championships are an annual contest between the home countries of England, Scotland and Wales. Although, no tournament was held in 1989. The championship's points scoring system has changed several times. The competition must not be staged in the same country that is hosting that years annual Six Nations Cup. The national darts organisation of the host country will organise that years competition.

Final standings

Men's event

Women's event

References 

1979 establishments in the United Kingdom
2015 disestablishments in the United Kingdom
British Darts Organisation tournaments